Frank Mischke (born 19 June 1961 in Berlin) is a former professional German footballer.

Mischke made 13 appearances in the Fußball-Bundesliga for Hertha BSC during his playing career.

References

External links 
 

1961 births
Living people
Footballers from Berlin
German footballers
Association football midfielders
Bundesliga players
2. Bundesliga players
Tennis Borussia Berlin players
Hertha BSC players
SC Staaken players